John Maron (Youhana Maroun;) (628, Sirmaniyah or Sarmin, present Syria – 707, Kfarhy, Lebanon), was a Syriac monk, and the first Maronite Patriarch. He is revered as a saint by the Maronite Church and universal Catholic Church, and is commemorated on March 2. He died and was buried in Kfarhy near Batroun, in Lebanon, where a shrine is dedicated to him.

Jérôme Labourt, writing in the Catholic Encyclopedia says that John Maron's "very existence is extremely doubtful... if he existed at all, it was as a simple monk". French theologian Eusèbe Renaudot similarly held doubts regarding John Maron's existence. Other scholarship has assessed John Maron as having existed and served as Maronite Patriarch when invasions by Byzantine emperor Justinian II were repulsed and the Maronite people gained a greater degree of political independence.

Early life

Maronite history prior to the sixteenth century is problematic as so many points are obscure. According to Maronite sources, John was born in Sarum, a town located south of the city of Antioch. He was the son of Agathon and Anohamia. He was called John the Sarumite since his father was governor of Sarum.  His paternal grandfather, Prince Alidipas, was the nephew of Carloman, a Frankish Prince, and governed Antioch. John was educated in Antioch and the Monastery of Saint Maron, studying mathematics, sciences, philosophy, theology, philology and scripture. He became a monk at the monastery, adding the name Maron to his own.

John studied Greek and patrology in Constantinople. Returning to Saint Maron's, he wrote on such diverse topics as teaching, rhetoric, the sacraments, management of Church property, legislative techniques, and liturgy. He composed the Eucharistic Prayer which still bears his name. As a young priest he engaged himself in ecumenical debates with the Monophysites. Noted as a teacher and preacher, he explained the doctrine of the Council of Chalcedon (which focused on the nature of Jesus as both God and human), wrote a series of letters to the faithful against Monophysitism which Beit-Marun then adopted, after which he purportedly travelled Syria to explain the heresy.

The first Maronite Patriarch

The Patriarch of Antioch, Anastasius II was martyred in 609. With the ongoing Byzantine–Sasanian War and general unrest in the area, Constantinople began to appoint a series of titular patriarchs. Maronite sources give the date of John Maron's election to Patriarch of Antioch and All the East as 685. John received the approval of Pope Sergius I, and became the first Maronite Patriarch.

Works
John Maron works are in Syriac:

 On Faith
 Questions to the Monophysites

See also

List of Maronite Patriarchs

References

Sources
 Michael Breydy: Johannes Maron. In: Biographisch-Bibliographisches Kirchenlexikon (BBKL). Band 3, Bautz, Herzberg 1992, Sp. 480–482.
 Siméon Vailhé, «Origines religieuses des Maronites», Échos d'Orient, t. IV, 1900–1901, n° 2, p. 96-102, et n° 3, p. 154-162.
 Michel Breydy, Jean Maron. Expose de la foi et autres opuscules. Syr. 209. CSCO (Corpus Scriptorum Christianorum Orientalium), Bd. 407, Peeters, Louvain 1988
 Britannica, The Editors of Encyclopaedia. "Honorius I". Encyclopædia Britannica, 8 Oct. 2020, https://www.britannica.com/biography/Honorius-I. Accessed 21 August 2021.
 Moosa, Matti. “The Relation of the Maronites of Lebanon to the Mardaites and Al-Jarājima.” Speculum, vol. 44, no. 4, 1969, pp. 597–608. JSTOR, www.jstor.org/stable/2850386. Accessed 21 Aug. 2021.
 LILIE, RALPH-JOHANNES. “Reality and Invention: Reflections on Byzantine Historiography.” Dumbarton Oaks Papers, vol. 68, 2014, pp. 157–210. JSTOR, www.jstor.org/stable/24643758. Accessed 21 Aug. 2021.
 Britannica, The Editors of Encyclopaedia. "Maronite church". Encyclopædia Britannica, 13 Dec. 2019, https://www.britannica.com/topic/Maronite-church. Accessed 21 August 2021.

External links
John Maron at Catholic-Forum
Official Website of the Maronite Patriarchate

7th-century births
707 deaths
Religious writers
Syrian archbishops
Syrian Christian saints
Maronite saints
Lebanese Maronite saints
8th-century archbishops
Maronite Patriarchs of Antioch
8th-century Christian saints
7th-century Maronite Catholic bishops
7th-century writers
7th-century archbishops
8th-century Maronite Catholic bishops
7th-century people
8th-century people